768 Naval Air Squadron (768 NAS) was a Naval Air Squadron of the Royal Navy's Fleet Air Arm.

History of 768 NAS

Deck Landing Training Squadron (1941 - 1946) 

768 Naval Air Squadron formed as a Deck Landing Training Squadron, on the 13 January 1941, at RNAS Arbroath, located near Arbroath in East Angus, Scotland. The squadron was initially equipped with Swordfish, a biplane torpedo bomber  aircraft. Dummy deck landing was trained at Arbroath, but advanced carrier deck landing training was done on the unique HMS Argus, the Royal Navy aircraft carrier, that was converted from an ocean liner and served as a training ship, via a detachment at RNAS Machrihanish (HMS Landrail), located 3 miles (5 km) west of Campbeltown in Argyll and Bute, Scotland. The squadron moved there full time on the 1 March 1943.

By this time the squadron operated Fulmar, a British carrier-borne reconnaissance/fighter aircraft,  Martlet, an American carrier-based fighter aircraft, Sea Hurricane and Spitfire (hooked) aircraft, alongside the initial Swordfish aircraft.

During 1945 the unit moved to RNAS East Haven (HMS Peewit)

References

Citations

Bibliography 
 

700 series Fleet Air Arm squadrons
Military units and formations established in 1941
Military units and formations of the Royal Navy in World War II